Stanley Pool District, later named Moyen-Congo District was a district of the Congo Free State and Belgian Congo. 
It disappeared in a reorganization of 1914.

Congo Free State

Article 3 of the decree of 16 April 1887 provided for the Congo Free State to be divided into administrative districts headed by district commissioners, assisted by one or more deputies.
The decree of 1 August 1888 divided the Congo Free State into eleven districts, of which the first five were in the lower Congo region, including Stanley Pool District with its headquarters in Léopoldville.

A map of the Congo Free State in 1897 shows the Stanley Pool District stretching along the east bank of the Congo River upstream from the Livingstone Falls past Léopoldville to just south of Lukolela.
The district was named after Stanley Pool, a widening of the Congo above Léopoldville.
It was bordered to the south by the Cataractes District, to the east by the Kwango, Lualaba Kassai and Lac Léopold II districts, and to the north by Équateur District.
The French territories were across the river to the west.

Belgian Congo

The Free State was annexed by Belgium in 1908 as the Belgian Congo.
On a 1910 map the Stanley Pool District had been renamed Moyen-Congo District, with various changes to the boundary.
It was now bordered by the Bas-Congo District to the south, Kwango and Lac Léopold II districts to the east, and Équateur district to the north.
A major reorganization in 1914 adjusted boundaries and grouped the districts into provinces.
A 1926 map shows a new urban district of Léopoldville had been created around the capital city, and Moyen-Congo District had been merged into Bas-Congo (south) and Lac Léopold II (north).

Maps

See also
Districts of the Congo Free State
Districts of the Belgian Congo

References

Sources

 / http://www.kaowarsom.be/en/online_maps

Districts of the Congo Free State
Districts of the Belgian Congo